Sir Thomas William Holderness, 1st Baronet,  (11 June 1849 – 16 September 1924) was the first former member of the Indian Civil Service to be appointed to the post of Permanent Under-Secretary of State for India (although Sir George Russell Clerk had previously been a member of the East India Company Civil Service).

Early life and education
Holderness came from a wealthy Hull family, but was born in Saint John, New Brunswick, Canada, where his parents, John William Holderness and his wife Mary Ann (née Macleod), were then settled. The family returned to England shortly after his birth. Although the premature death of his father in 1865 left the family in straitened circumstances, he managed to pay for his education at Cheltenham College by winning several scholarships and prizes, and in 1879 went up to University College, Oxford, again with a scholarship. He passed the entrance exam for the Indian Civil Service in 1870, one of only about forty who passed every year, with high enough marks to be allowed to choose which province he served in. He received a second in classical mods in 1871 and a second in law and modern history in 1872, leaving for India after his graduation.

Career in the Indian Civil Service
Holderness chose to enter civil service in the North-Western Provinces and served from 1873 to 1876 as a district officer in the small towns of Bijnor, Fatehpur, and Muzaffarnagar. He also wrote articles for the press, and his writings and administrative ability brought him to the notice of Lieutenant-Governor Sir John Strachey, who called him to the provincial capital, Allahabad, in 1876 to take up a post in the provincial government offices.

In 1881, he was appointed under-secretary to the Revenue Department of the Government of India in Calcutta. In 1885, he became head of Pilibhit district, and in 1888 he was appointed director of land records and agriculture of the North-Western Provinces. Later he became secretary to the Government of the North-West Provinces. In 1898, he was appointed secretary to the Revenue and Agricultural Department of the Government of India.

On retirement from the ICS in 1901, he joined the India Office in Whitehall as Secretary of the Revenue, Statistics and Commerce Department. On the death of Sir Richmond Ritchie in 1912, he became the permanent under-secretary, the professional head of the India Office, continuing to occupy the post until his retirement in 1919. Although he reached the usual retirement age of 65 in June 1914, he was granted an extension, which was extended still further after the outbreak of the First World War, in which his long experience of Indian administration was invaluable.

Awards and honours
Holderness was appointed Companion of the Order of the Star of India (CSI) in 1898, awarded the Kaisar-i-Hind Medal in Gold in 1901, and appointed Knight Commander of the Order of the Star of India (KCSI) in 1907. He was then appointed Knight Commander of the Order of the Bath (KCB) in the 1914 Birthday Honours and Knight Grand Cross of the Order of the Bath (GCB) in the 1917 Birthday Honours, and was created a baronet, of Tadworth, in the County of Surrey, in the 1920 New Year Honours. He was offered a peerage, but refused on financial grounds.

Family and later life
On 14 March 1885, Holderness married Lucy Shepherd Elsmie, daughter of George Robert Elsmie, a fellow member of the ICS. They had a daughter and a son. He died suddenly while walking on the golf links at Walton-on-the-Hill near his home in Tadworth, Surrey. He was succeeded in the baronetcy by his son, Ernest, a British international golfer.

Writings
 Narrative of the Indian Famine, 1897
 Editor, 4th edition of Sir John Strachey's India, 1911
 People and Problems of India, 1912

Footnotes

References
Biography, Oxford Dictionary of National Biography
Obituary, The Times, 17 September 1924

1849 births
1924 deaths
People from Saint John, New Brunswick
People educated at Cheltenham College
Alumni of University College, Oxford
Indian Civil Service (British India) officers
Permanent Under-Secretaries of State for India
Baronets in the Baronetage of the United Kingdom
Knights Grand Cross of the Order of the Bath
Knights Commander of the Order of the Star of India
Recipients of the Kaisar-i-Hind Medal